Lepidochrysops abri is a butterfly in the family Lycaenidae. It is found in Cameroon.

References

Butterflies described in 2001
Lepidochrysops
Endemic fauna of Cameroon
Butterflies of Africa